Ethel & Ernest (subtitled "A True Story") is a 1998 graphic novel by British author and illustrator Raymond Briggs. It tells the story of the lives of Briggs' parents from their first meeting in 1928 to their deaths in 1971.

Story
The story is a chronological progression through poignant moments in the home lives of the titular couple, from when they first meet in 1928 to their deaths in 1971. Ethel, at first a lady's maid, with middle-class aspirations and firm notions of respectable behaviour, becomes a housewife when she marries, and later becomes a clerk in an office during the Second World War. Ernest, five years younger, is an easygoing milkman with socialist ideals and an enthusiastic interest in current affairs and the latest technology. They raise their son, Raymond, living in the same terraced house for 40 years, in a suburban street, through the Great Depression, World War II, the advent of television and other events.

Awards
Ethel & Ernest won the "Best Illustrated Book of the Year" at the 1999 British Book Awards.

Film adaptation
The book was adapted into the feature-length hand-drawn animated film Ethel & Ernest, voiced by Brenda Blethyn, Jim Broadbent and others. It was premiered at the London Film Festival on 15 October 2016, had a cinema release starting on 28 October 2016, and was broadcast on BBC television on BBC One at 7:30pm on 28 December 2016. 
It had its North American premiere at the 2017 Palm Springs International Film Festival by its US distributors, and was chosen by an audience vote to be screened in the "Best of the Fest" on the final day.

It featured the Paul McCartney song "In The Blink of an Eye".

In the UK, it was repeated on BBC Two on 10 August 2022, in light of the news of Briggs' death coming earlier that day.

References

External Links
 
 

1998 British novels
1998 graphic novels
British graphic novels
British novels adapted into films
British comics adapted into films
Couples
Jonathan Cape books
Non-fiction graphic novels
Novels by Raymond Briggs
Novels set in London
Novels set in the 1920s
Novels set in the 1930s
Novels set in the 1940s
Novels set in the 1950s
Novels set in the 1960s
Novels set in the 1970s
Pantheon Books graphic novels
Picture books by Raymond Briggs